Mount Brown Conservation Park is a protected area in the Flinders Ranges of South Australia. The park has established walking trails, including a section of the Heysen Trail. The park is managed by the Department of Environment, Water and Natural Resources; entry is free.

The conservation park is classified as an IUCN Category VI protected area.

History
The conservation park was dedicated in November 1993 and its name was derived from the former forest reserve that occupied part of its extent.

Prior use of the land
Prior to European settlement, the land was solely in the custody of the  Nukunu people. Europeans first visited the area on 10 and 11 March 1802 when a group of people from  led by the Scottish botanist, Robert Brown, climbed Mount Brown. From the 1870s, the land was used for forestry with the focus being on nursery activity to produce trees for planting in drier parts of South Australia and other Australian states. After 1900, the nursery role of the forest ceased and the land was leased for pastoral use, a practice which continued until the 1990s. Part of the land was declared as a forest reserve possibly in 1925. In 1990, the forest reserve status was withdrawn as part of a rationalisation of land holdings by the responsible South Australian government agency, the Department of Woods and Forests.

See also
 Protected areas of South Australia

Citations and references

Citations

References

External links
Mount Brown Conservation Park official website
Entry for Mount Brown Conservation Park on protected planet

Conservation parks of South Australia
Protected areas established in 1993
1993 establishments in Australia
Far North (South Australia)
Flinders Ranges